The nation of Botswana has been ranked as one of the least corrupt countries in Africa by many large, well-known international organizations. However, corruption is not eradicated, and can still be seen in a wide majority of different governmental sectors and in differing forms. To combat this corruption, Botswana has passed many legal acts and policies with the aim of stopping its growth.

The 2022 Transparency International Corruption Perceptions Index gave Botswana a score of 60 on a scale from 0 ("highly corrupt") to 100 ("very clean").  When ranked by score, Botswana ranked 35th (tied with Spain, Saint Vincent and the Grenadines, and Cabo Verde) among the 180 countries in the Index. For comparison, the best score was 90 (Denmark, ranked 1), and the worst score was 12 (Somalia, ranked 180). Botswana, along with Cabo Verde, had the second-highest score in Africa, after Seychelles.

Another international organization, the Business Anti-Corruption Portal, ranked Botswana as moderate in regards to the amount of corruption seen in the country. The Business Anti-Corruption Portal continued on, stating that multiple government sectors, such as the Judicial services, Police, Legislation, Public services, Tax Administration and Public Procurement all see varying risks of corruption.

In the Global Competitiveness Report conducted in the years of 2011 and 2012, it was reported that corruption in Botswana is one of the most problematic factors when it comes to doing business in the country.

Extent 
In a survey carried out by Afrobarometer, 32 percent of those polled thought either all or most of the officials in non-local government and those with jobs as civil servants were involved with corruption. 29 percent thought the same of members of parliament. Local government was perceived as less corrupt, with 20 percent saying either all or most of the officials in local government were involved with corruption.

When asked if they personally had to bribe a government official to obtain employment, a government payment (such as a pension or a loan), electricity or water, or housing and land, each category had 96 to 97 percent responding they had never bribed a government official. This suggests the experience with corruption of people in Botswana is much lower than that of people living in other countries in Africa.

Forms 
Corruption does not come in one singular form, instead it comes in two forms that affect different sectors of Botswana. Corruption in Botswana is primarily used by the small, state elite. It is these individuals that have used their power to create patronage networks and have the interests of both the public sector and private sector blur together. Combating this form of corruption is much harder. It is more entrenched in the state government and private industries, and the small minority that is benefitting from this corruption can use their power to ensure that it continues on. Nepotism and patronage are the preferred methods of these state elites.

Corruption is not only relegated to the state elites. Botswana is also a victim to petty and bureaucratic corruption. However, this form of corruption is typically rarely seen and perceived to be low.

Anti-corruption efforts 

Corruption in Botswana is primarily investigated by the Directorate on Corruption and Economic Crimes (DCEC). It is because of the Directorate on Corruption and Economic Crimes that Botswana is able to stay relatively low on the corruption scale. This is because of the high prosecution rates that the Directorate on Corruption and Economic Crime is able to achieve. To aid in fighting corruption, Botswana is also a member of the Eastern and Southern Anti-Money Laundering Group.

Mokgweetsi Masisi, the current President of Botswana, has also had a hand in combating corruption in his country. At a regional conference dedicated to combating corruption on the African continent, Masisi gave a speech as the guest of honour, where he called on governments to implement corruption-fighting policies.  These policies would require internal accounting and auditing mechanisms, strong anti-corruption institutions to provide oversight, and the rule of law and due process. Masisi also explained the various methods that his country has adopted in combating its own corruption, which include the creation of a specialized court only for criminal acts of corruption, and a number of different legal acts, such as the Whistle Blower Act and the Proceeds and Instruments of Crime Act.

When it comes to other legal frameworks and acts passed to combat corruption in the country, the most widely noted is the Corruption and Economic Crime Act of 1994. This act created the Directorate on Corruption and Economic Crimes (DCEC), which has led corruption-fighting efforts in Botswana, and granted the Directorate its powers. The Corruption and Economic Crime Act also has a number of other powers, such as outlawing the solicitation, receiving and accepting of a payment with aims to manipulate a public civil servant. Some more powers of the CECA include numerous whistleblower protections.

References

Government of Botswana
Botswana
Crime in Botswana by type